Patrick Michael Byrne may refer to:

 Patrick M. Byrne (born 1962), American entrepreneur
 Patrick Michael Byrne (anthropologist) (1856–1932), Australian telegraph operator, anthropologist and natural scientist